Maksim Gennadyevich Burchenko (born 21 January 1983) is a Russian former footballer.

External links
  Player page on the official FC Shinnik Yaroslavl website
 

1983 births
People from Stary Oskol
Living people
Russian footballers
Russia under-21 international footballers
Association football midfielders
FC Elista players
FC Metallurg Lipetsk players
FC Rostov players
FC Shinnik Yaroslavl players
Russian Premier League players
FC Torpedo Moscow players
FC Luch Vladivostok players
FC Volga Nizhny Novgorod players
FC Sokol Saratov players
FC Energomash Belgorod players
Sportspeople from Belgorod Oblast